South Springvale FC is an Australian semi-professional soccer club based in Springvale, a suburb of Melbourne, Victoria. The club was formed by local Greek Australians in 1968, as 'Sandown Dynamo'. The club currently competes in the Victorian State League Division 1. Their home ground is Warner Reserve.

South Springvale achieved national notoriety by qualifying for the 2014 FFA Cup Round of 32.

History
South Springvale was founded in 1968 by Greek immigrants who migrated to Australia in the early to mid-1960s. The club was initially called Sandown Dynamo and played at Springvale High Schools’ facilities. During the next 12 years, Sandown Dynamo competed in the Victorian Amateur Leagues, but rose quickly in the 1980s and 1990s, entering the Victorian Provisional Leagues in 1985, and gaining promotion to the Victorian State Leagues in 1992, reaching Victorian State League Division 2 by 2000.

In 1980 the club shifted to Warner Reserve whilst also changing its name to South Springvale Soccer Club. Over the next two decades the club endured many good years culminating in three championships, in 1990, 1991 and 1995, whilst also claiming the State League Cup in 1994. Since the 2014 season, the team has been competing in the FFV State League 1 South East.

In 2014, South Springvale defeated National Premier Leagues Victoria side Hume City in 3–0 in the 2014 Dockerty Cup Quarter-final to become the first Victorian club to qualify for the inaugural FFA Cup Round of 32, the first national round. South Springvale and Hakoah Sydney City East FC were the only two fourth tier sides to win through to the Round of 32. Aris drew South Cardiff FC and played them on 29 July as the home team at Kingston Heath Soccer Complex, winning on penalties after twice equalising after going behind, the first time through Florea and the second time through Dimitrakopoulos. Approximately 1,500 people were in attendance. Aris then drew Gold Coast, Queensland based side Palm Beach SC away from home, and so travelled to Queensland on 23 September 2014. In front of 2,300 people at Robina Stadium, Palm Beach narrowly won 1–0 through a Boxell goal in the 81st minute and ended Aris' FFA Cup adventure. In 2019, Aris were promoted to State League 1 following a 2nd place finish that season. The club is aiming to gain promotion to the NPL system for the first time this year.

Name and logo 
The club adopted its nickname and colours from Greek side Aris Thessaloniki F.C. The Greek side is known for its Yellow and black colours and this is why South Springvale play in those colours. Further, the club's crest is a homage to Aris with the logo even adopting the Greek spelling of Aris being 'APHS'.

Honors
  Dockety Cup – Runners Up: 2014.
  Victorian State League Division 3 South East – Runners up: 2002, 2010.
  Victorian State League Division 4 – Champions: 1995.
  Victorian Provisional League Division 1 – Champions: 1991.
  Victorian Provisional League Division 2 – Champions: 1990.
  Victorian Provisional League Division 3 – Runners up: 1988.
  Victorian State League Champions Cup – Champions: 1994.

Players

Current Senior Squad

Current Reserve Squad

Club Officials

Committee
President: Jim Simos
Vice President: Andrew Pagoulatos
Secretary: Heather Paliouras
Treasurer: Toula Simos 
Committee Member: Jim Banasios

Men’s Team Staff
Senior Team Head Coach: Steve Voursoukis
Senior Assistant Coach: George Balaskas
Senior Team Manager: Peter Tragakis
Reserve Team Head Coach: Peter Panagiotou 
Reserve Team Manager: Andrew Pagoulatos
Goalkeeper Coach: Michael Kikikakis
Physiotherapist: Adil Rodrigues Chico
Masseur: Adam Bedikian

References

External links
Official Club Website
Official Club TeamApp Website
 South Springvale on OzFootball

Soccer clubs in Melbourne
Victorian State League teams
Association football clubs established in 1975
1968 establishments in Australia
Sport in the City of Greater Dandenong
Greek-Australian culture in Melbourne
Diaspora sports clubs in Australia